This article lists political parties in Guatemala. 
Guatemala has a multi-party system, with two or three strong political parties and other parties that are electorally successful. According to law if a party fails to get 4% of the vote or at least one deputy in congress, the party is canceled.

Political culture 

Political parties in Guatemala are generally numerous and unstable. No party has won the presidency more than once. In every election period, the majority of the parties are small and newly formed.

Parties

Extra-parliamentary parties

Political parties in formation

Parties that did not contest the 2007 election
 Reform Movement (Movimiento Reformador)
 Social Democrat Party

Former parties
 Deregistered or ceased to function before 2003:
 Socialist Workers Unification
 Deregistered in 2003:
 Social Participative Democracy (Democracia Social Participativa)
 Transparency (Transparencia)
 Deregistered in 2007:
 Authentic Integral Development (Desarollo Integral Auténtico)
 Front for Democracy (Frente por la Democracia)
 Guatemalan Christian Democracy (Democracia Cristiana Guatemalteca)
 New Nation Alliance (Alianza Nueva Nación)
 Deregistered in 2015:
 Partido Patriota (Partido Patriota)
 Institutional Republican Party (Partido Republicano Institucional (PRI)) - formerly Guatemalan Republican Front (Frente Republicano Guatemalteco)
 Renewed Democratic Liberty (Libertad Democrática Renovada (LIDER))
 Movimiento Nueva República (MNR) (Movimiento Nueva República (MNR))
 Social Action Centre (Centro de Acción Social (CASA))
 New Heart Nation - (Corazon Nueva Nacion (CNN))
 Became the Grand National Alliance:
 National Solidarity Party (Partido Solidaridad Nacional)

See also
 Politics of Guatemala
 Elections in Guatemala

References

External links
Guatemalan Electoral and Political Parties law

Politics of Guatemala
 
Guatemala
Political parties
Guatemala
Political parties